Mandaloun may refer to:
 Mandaloun, a type of window
 Mandaloun (horse), American thoroughbred race horse
 Majdaloun, alt. spelling for this Lebanese village